France was the last of four s, the first dreadnoughts built for the French Navy. The ship was completed just before the start of World War I in August 1914. Even though France was not officially completed, she ferried the President of France to Russia during the July Crisis for consultations. She spent the war providing cover for the Otranto Barrage that blockaded the Austro-Hungarian Navy in the Adriatic Sea and sometimes served as a flagship. After the war France and her sister ship  participated in the occupation of Constantinople and were then sent to the Black Sea in 1919 to support Allied troops in the Southern Russia Intervention. The war-weary crews of both ships briefly mutinied, but it was easily put down and she returned to France mid-year. Striking an uncharted rock off the French coast in 1922, she foundered four hours later.

Background and description

The following year, the new Minister of the Navy, Augustin Boué de Lapeyrère, selected a design that was comparable to the foreign dreadnoughts then under construction as part of the 1906 Naval Programme. Their crew numbered 1,115 men as a private ship and increased to 1,187 when serving as a flagship. The ships were powered by two licence-built Parsons steam turbine sets, each driving two propeller shafts using steam provided by 24 Belleville boilers. These boilers were coal-burning with auxiliary oil sprayers and were designed to produce .

The main battery of the Courbet class consisted of twelve Canon de  Mle 1906–1910 guns mounted in six twin-gun turrets, with two pairs of superfiring turrets fore and aft of the superstructure, and a pair of wing turrets amidships. Their secondary armament was twenty-two Canon de  Mle 1910 guns, which were mounted in casemates in the hull. Four Canon de  Mle 1902 Hotchkiss guns were fitted, two on each broadside in the superstructure. They were also armed with four  submerged torpedo tubes and could stow 10 mines below decks. The gun turrets were protected by 250 mm of armour and  plates protected the casemates.

Career
France, the seventh ship of her name to serve in the French Navy, was ordered on 1 August 1911 from Ateliers et Chantiers de la Loire. The ship was laid down on 30 November at its shipyard in Saint-Nazaire and launched on 7 November 1912. She was formally declared completed on 1 July 1914 to carry President Raymond Poincaré, on a state visit to Saint Petersburg, Russia. He boarded the ship on 16 July. Escorted by Jean Bart, France arrived at Kronstadt on 20 July after encountering the battlecruisers of the German I Scouting Group in the Baltic Sea en route. The French ships made a port visit to Stockholm, Sweden, on 25–26 July, but a planned visit to Copenhagen, Denmark, was cancelled due to rising tensions between Austria-Hungary and Serbia; they arrived at Dunkerque on 29 July.

World War I
When France declared war on Germany on 3 August, the sisters were in Brest and departed for Toulon that night. They were met off Valencia, Spain, on the 6th by their sister  and the semi-dreadnoughts  and  because Jean Bart was having problems with her 305 mm ammunition and France had yet to load any. The ships rendezvoused with a troop convoy the following day and escorted it to Toulon. France entered service on 10 October and was assigned to the 2nd Battle Squadron of the 1st Naval Army on 21 October at the mouth of the Adriatic Sea to prevent the Austro-Hungarian fleet from attempting to break out of the Adriatic. The torpedoing of Jean Bart on 21 December by the Austro-Hungarian submarine  showed that the battleships were vulnerable to this threat and they were withdrawn to spend the rest of the month further south at an anchorage in Navarino Bay.

On 11 January 1915, the French were alerted that the Austro-Hungarian fleet was going to sortie from its base at Pola, so France and her sisters Courbet and Paris led the 1st Naval Army north to the Albanian coast. It proved to be a false alarm, and they were back at their moorings three days later. In the meantime, the ships patrolled the Ionian Sea as the danger of submarine attacks in the restricted waters of the Strait forced the battleships south. The declaration of war on Austria-Hungary by Italy on 23 May and the Italian decision to assume responsibility for naval operations in the Adriatic, allowed the French Navy to withdraw to either Malta or Bizerte, French Tunisia, to cover the Otranto Barrage. A fire broke out aboard France on 25 July and she was forced to return to Toulon for repairs that lasted until 14 October. Two days later Vice-Admiral Louis Dartige du Fournet assumed command of the 1st Naval Army and hoisted his flag aboard France, which remained in Malta for the rest of the year. At some point during the year, the ship's 47 mm guns were put on high-angle mountings to allow them to be used as anti-aircraft (AA) guns. They were later supplemented by a pair of  Mle 1891 G guns on anti-aircraft mounts.

On 27 April 1916, the French began using the port of Argostoli on the Greek island of Cephalonia as a base. Dartige du Fornet transferred his flag to the battleship  on 23 May. Around this time, many men from the battleships' crews were transferred to anti-submarine ships. At the beginning of 1917, the French began to use the Greek island of Corfu as well, but growing shortages of coal severely limited the battleships' ability to go to sea. The big ships have lost 50 per cent of the capability they had several months ago. In 1918, they were almost immobile, leaving Corfu only for maintenance and repairs. On 1 July, the 1st Naval Army was reorganised with France assigned to the 1st Battle Division of the 1st Battle Squadron.

Post-war activities

After the Armistice of Mudros was signed on 30 October between the Allies and the Ottoman Empire, the ship participated in the occupation of Constantinople. In early 1919, France, flagship of Vice-Admiral Jean-Françoise-Charles Amet, and Jean Bart were transferred to the Black Sea to reinforce the French forces opposing the Bolsheviks. A few days after bombarding Bolshevik troops advancing on Sevastopol on 16 April and forcing them to retreat, Frances war-weary crew briefly mutinied on 19 April, inspired by socialist and revolutionary sympathisers. Unlike Jean Barts captain, who had managed to quell the mutiny aboard his ship by the following day, Frances crew was still mutinous and Amet hoped to reduce tensions by meeting the mutineers' demands for leave and letting crewmen with a history of good behaviour ashore. The sailors mingled with a pro-Bolshevik demonstration and the mixed group was challenged by a company of Greek infantry, which opened fire. The demonstrators fled and encountered a landing party from Jean Bart, which also fired upon them. A total of about 15 people were wounded, included six sailors, one of whom later died of his wounds. Delegates from the other mutinous crews were not allowed aboard and the mutiny collapsed when Amet agreed to meet their main demand to take the ships home. France was the first to depart on 23 April, but the ship sailed to Bizerte before continuing onwards to Toulon. Twenty-six crewmen were sentenced to prison terms upon her return, although the sentences were commuted in 1922 as part of a bargain between Poincaré, now Prime Minister, and the parties of the left.

On 1 July, all the Courbets were assigned to the 1st Division of the 1st Squadron. On 10 February 1920, the 1st Naval Army was disbanded and replaced by the Eastern Mediterranean Squadron and its Western counterpart; all the sisters were assigned to the 1st Battle Squadron of the latter unit, with Courbet, Jean Bart and Paris in the 1st Battle Division and France in the 2nd Battle Division, with Rear-Admiral Louis-Hippolyte Violette commanding the latter from France. The two squadrons were combined into the Mediterranean Squadron on 20 July 1921.

France and the battleship  hosted the British battleship  and light cruiser  during a port visit to Villefranche from 18 February to 1 March 1922. The two French battleships had a gunnery exercise on 28 June using the former Austro-Hungarian battleship  as a target and sank her. On 18 July, France, Paris and Bretagne began a cruise visiting French ports in the Bay of Biscay and English Channel. On the evening of 25/26 August, France struck an uncharted rock while entering Quiberon Bay at 00:57. The after boiler room flooded quickly and the ship lost all power at 01:10. She had a 5° list by 02:00 and the order was given to abandon ship. The battleship capsized two hours later after Bretagne and Paris were able to rescue all but three of her crew. Her wreck was slowly broken up in place in 1935, 1952 and 1958.

Footnotes

Bibliography

Further reading
 

Courbet-class battleships
World War I battleships of France
Shipwrecks in the Bay of Biscay
1912 ships
Maritime incidents in 1922